The Journal of Emerging Market Finance  is a triannual peer-reviewed academic journal covering the theory and practice of finance in emerging markets. The journal was established in 2002 and is published by SAGE Publications. The editor-in-chief is 	G. Balasubramanian (Institute for Financial Management and Research).

Abstracting and indexing 
The journal is abstracted and indexed in:
EconLit
Emerging Sources Citation Index
International Bibliography of the Social Sciences
ProQuest databases
Research Papers in Economics
Scopus

References

External links

SAGE Publishing academic journals
Publications established in 2002
Finance journals
English-language journals
Triannual journals